Everybody Digs Bill Evans is an album by jazz musician Bill Evans. It was released in early 1959 on the Riverside label.

History

Everybody Digs Bill Evans was Evans's second album, done two years after his first record as a leader. Though his producer (Orrin Keepnews) had wanted Evans to record a follow-up album to his debut sooner, the self-critical Evans felt he had "nothing new to say" before this album.

The recording captures Evans at a time when he frequently played extended musical ideas using block chords, a technique also favored by Milt Buckner, George Shearing, Oscar Peterson, and other jazz pianists. That combined with his use of pedals gave him a sound considered by critics to be innovative. Though Evans had quit the Miles Davis band a month before the album was recorded, Davis was enamored of Evans's piano sound as it was developing through 1958, and decided to use him as the pianist for four of the five tracks on the 1959 recording Kind of Blue.

Everybody Digs Bill Evans was reissued in 1987 with one bonus track.

Reception

Writing for Allmusic, music critic Michael G. Nastos called the album "a landmark recording for the young pianist... Though not his very best effort overall, Evans garnered great attention, and rightfully so, from this important album of 1958." Samuel Chell of All About Jazz wrote: "With its varied tempos, rhythms and programming, Everybody Digs Bill Evans sustains interest without allowing the listener for a moment to mistake the singular, inimitable voice of the leader. It's not hard to understand why many Evans followers, 'casual' and otherwise, list it as their favorite of the pianist's recordings. It's doubtful there's a more introspective, meditative trio set on record, yet the pianist shows he can dance as well."

It was voted number 3 in the 50 All-Time Overlooked Jazz Albums from Colin Larkin's All Time Top 1000 Albums.

Track listing 
 "Minority" (Gigi Gryce) – 5:23
 "Young and Foolish" (Albert Hague, Arnold B. Horwitt) – 5:54
 "Lucky to Be Me" (Leonard Bernstein, Betty Comden, Adolph Green) – 3:41
 "Night and Day" (Cole Porter) – 7:35
 "Tenderly" (Walter Gross) – 3:34
 "Peace Piece" (Bill Evans) – 6:44
 "What Is There to Say?" (Vernon Duke, Yip Harburg) – 4:55
 "Oleo" (Sonny Rollins) – 4:09
 "Epilogue" (Bill Evans) – 0:41
Bonus track:
 "Some Other Time" (Leonard Bernstein, Betty Comden, Adolph Green) – 6:09

Personnel 
Bill Evans - piano
Sam Jones - bass
Philly Joe Jones - drums

References

External links
Jazz Discography entries for Bill Evans
Bill Evans Memorial Library discography

1959 albums
Bill Evans albums
Riverside Records albums
Albums produced by Orrin Keepnews